Karel Piták (born 28 January 1980) is a Czech association football midfielder. He currently plays for SK Zápy.

Piták was part of the Czech side which won the UEFA U-21 Championships in 2002.

Since July 2022 Piták is manager of Slavia Prague (women).

References

External links
 
 
 
 
 Profile at redbulls.com

1980 births
Living people
Czech footballers
Czech Republic youth international footballers
Czech Republic under-21 international footballers
Czech Republic international footballers
Czech First League players
Association football midfielders
FC Red Bull Salzburg players
Sportspeople from Hradec Králové
FC Hradec Králové players
SK Slavia Prague players
FK Jablonec players
SK Slavia Prague (women) managers